Lauke is a surname. Notable people with the surname include:

 Gerhard Lauke (born 1952), German cyclist

See also
 Hauke
 Laurens Pluijmaekers (born 1984), Dutch competitive gamer; nicknamed "Lauke"
 Luke (name)
 Michael Laucke (born 1947), Canadian guitarist and composer